Eugryllacris is a genus of Orthopterans, sometimes known as 'leaf-folding crickets' in the tribe Gryllacridini.  The recorded distribution is: the Indian subcontinent, China, Korea, Japan, Indochina, western Malesia up to the Maluku Islands.

Species 
The Orthoptera Species File lists:
 Eugryllacris bifoliata Bian & Shi, 2016
 Eugryllacris comotti (Griffini, 1908)
 Eugryllacris crassicauda Ingrisch, 2018
 Eugryllacris cylindrigera (Karny, 1926)
 Eugryllacris elongata Bian & Shi, 2016
 Eugryllacris fanjingshanensis Bian & Shi, 2016
 Eugryllacris gandaki Ingrisch, 2018
 Eugryllacris guomashan Ingrisch, 2018
 Eugryllacris hainanensis Bin & Bian, 2021
 Eugryllacris inversa Ingrisch, 2018
 Eugryllacris japonica (Matsumura & Shiraki, 1908)
 Eugryllacris lobulis Bian & Shi, 2016
 Eugryllacris longifissa Bian & Shi, 2016
 Eugryllacris loriae (Griffini, 1908)
 Eugryllacris maculipennis (Stål, 1877)
 Eugryllacris malaccensis (Griffini, 1908)
 Eugryllacris moesta (Brunner von Wattenwyl, 1888)
 Eugryllacris moestissima (Brunner von Wattenwyl, 1888)
 Eugryllacris nigriabdominis Bin & Bian, 2021
 Eugryllacris panteli (Bolívar, 1900)
 Eugryllacris poultoniana (Griffini, 1909)
 Eugryllacris princeps (Stål, 1877)
 Eugryllacris ruficeps (Serville, 1831)- type species (as Gryllacris ruficeps Serville = E. ruficeps ruficeps locality Java – illustrated)
 Eugryllacris sarawaccensis (Karny, 1928)
 Eugryllacris serricauda Ingrisch, 2018
 Eugryllacris sordida (Fritze, 1908)
 Eugryllacris sulcata Ingrisch, 2018
 Eugryllacris tiga Yin & Shen, 2021
 Eugryllacris trabicauda Ingrisch, 2018
 Eugryllacris vaginalis (Pictet & Saussure, 1893)
 Eugryllacris vermicauda Ingrisch, 2018
 Eugryllacris viridescens (Walker, 1870)
 Eugryllacris vittipes (Walker, 1869)
 Eugryllacris xiei Bian & Shi, 2016

References

External Links
photos at iNaturalist

Ensifera genera
Gryllacrididae
Orthoptera of Indo-China
Orthoptera of Malesia